= Wanjiku Chebet Kanjumba =

Aerospace engineer

- Education: Embry-Riddle Aeronautical University, M.S 2021 Embry-Riddle Aeronautical University, B.S 2020
- Occupation: Aerospace Engineer Entrepreneur Scientist-Astronaut
- Organization: Vicillion

Wanjiku Chebet Kanjumba is an aerospace engineer, entrepreneur, and Project PoSSUM Scientist-Astronaut Candidate Program graduate. She is the co-founder, CEO, and chairwoman of Vicillion, a global infrastructure development firm.

== Education ==
While pursuing her bachelor's in Embry-Riddle Aeronautical University, Kanjumba enrolled at the Project Polar Suborbital Science in the Upper Mesosphere (PoSSUM) Academy, where she became the first Kenyan-born to graduate from the program.

== Career ==
During her master's studies, Kanjumba started Vicillion with two other people, which at the time was a technology research & development lab but later developed into a global infrastructure development firm where their flagship project currently is developing and operating what is marketed as the world's first equatorial commercially operated spaceport, equipped for geosynchronous and geostationary launches.
